The football tournament at the 1930 Central American and Caribbean Games was held in Havana from 16 March to 4 April.

The gold medal was won by Cuba who won the Second Stage with 9 points.

Squads

First stage 

Group winners and runners-up advanced to the second stage. 3-2-1 points system used.

Group A

Group B

Second stage

Final ranking

Statistics

Goalscorers

References

External links 

Results
Match Details

1930 Central American and Caribbean Games
1930
International association football competitions hosted by Cuba